George R. Chapman (born 23 October 1886, deceased) was a Scottish professional footballer. He initially played as a centre half during his early career before becoming a centre forward. Born in Broxburn, he started his career with Raith Rovers and later assisted Heart of Midlothian. In 1908, Chapman moved to England to play for Blackburn Rovers in the Football League First Division and made 67 league appearances during two seasons with the club. He returned to Scotland in 1910 when he was signed by Rangers and spent one season with the Glasgow club. Chapman rejoined Blackburn in 1911 and remained with the Ewood Park club for the next four seasons, scoring 29 goals in 71 league matches. His time at Blackburn was curtailed by the outbreak of the First World War, which brought a halt to English competitive football in 1915. When competitive football recommenced, Chapman signed with Lancashire Combination side Accrington Stanley.

During the 1915–16 season, Chapman appeared as a guest player in three wartime matches for Burnley, in which he scored three goals.

References

1886 births
Year of death missing
Scottish footballers
Association football forwards
Association football defenders
Raith Rovers F.C. players
Heart of Midlothian F.C. players
Blackburn Rovers F.C. players
Rangers F.C. players
Accrington Stanley F.C. (1891) players
English Football League players
Burnley F.C. wartime guest players
Sportspeople from Broxburn, West Lothian
Footballers from West Lothian